Sano Tenma (佐野天馬, born July 25,1997) is a Japanese kickboxer who has fought in K-1, Krush, and Glory of Heroes.

Championships and awards 
Professional
Bigbang
 2017 Bigbang Featherweight Champion (1 defense)
Krush
 2014 Krush -55kg Rookie of the Year Tournament Winner

Amateur
 2014 K-1 Koshien Tournament Runner-up
 2013 Shin Karate All Japan G-1 Grand Prix Lightweight Champion
 2012 Shin Karate All Japan G-3 Grand Prix Middle School 60kg Champion
 2011 Shin Karate 207th Tokyo K-3 Tournament -48kg Winner
 2010 Shin Karate 160th K-3 Tournament -48kg Winner

Kickboxing record

  
|-  style="background:#c5d2ea"
| 2022-03-20|| Draw || align=left| Kiewsongsaen Flyskygym || Big Bang 41 || Tokyo, Japan || Decision || 3 || 3:00
|-  style="background:#cfc;"
| 2021-05-30|| Win || align=left| Kotaro Shimano || K-1 World GP 2021: Japan Bantamweight Tournament || Tokyo, Japan || Decision (Unanimous)|| 3 ||3:00
|-  style="background:#fbb;"
| 2020-03-28|| Loss ||align=left| Naoki Yamamoto || Krush.112 || Tokyo, Japan || Ext.R Decision (Unanimous) || 4 || 3:00
|-  style="background:#fbb;"
| 2019-11-08|| Loss ||align=left| Takahito Niimi || Krush 107 || Tokyo, Japan || Decision (Majority) || 3 || 3:00
|-  style="background:#cfc;"
| 2019-08-31|| Win ||align=left| Riku Morisaka || Krush 104 || Tokyo, Japan || Decision (Unanimous) || 3 || 3:00
|-  style="background:#FFBBBB;"
| 2019-02-16|| Loss ||align=left| Tetsuji Noda|| Krush.98|| Tokyo, Japan || Decision (Majority) || 3 || 3:00
|-  style="background:#CCFFCC;"
| 2018-11-04|| Win ||align=left| Ryo Pegasus|| Bigbang Isehara 2018 || Tokyo, Japan || KO (Knee to the head) || 2 || 0:49
|-
! style=background:white colspan=9 |
|-  style="background:#fbb;"
| 2018-07-28|| Loss ||align=left| Wang Junguang || Glory of Heroes 33: Shanghai || Shanghai, China || Decision (Unanimous) || 3 || 3:00
|-  style="background:#CCFFCC;"
| 2018-06-03|| Win ||align=left| Kenichi Takeuchi || Bigbang 33 || Tokyo, Japan || Decision (Split)  || 3 || 3:00
|-  style="background:#fbb;"
| 2018-03-10|| Loss ||align=left| Ryusei Ashizawa || Krush.86 || Tokyo, Japan || Decision (Majority) || 3 || 3:00
|-  style="background:#CCFFCC;"
| 2017-12-03|| Win ||align=left| Ryo Pegasus|| Bigbang 31 || Tokyo, Japan || Decision (Unanimous) || 3 || 3:00
|-
! style=background:white colspan=9 |
|-  style="background:#CCFFCC;"
| 2017-09-03|| Win ||align=left| Yu Wor.Wanchai|| Bigbang 30 || Tokyo, Japan || KO (Left Body Kick) || 2 || 1:22
|-  style="background:#cfc;"
| 2017-07-16|| Win ||align=left| Yun Qi|| Krush 77 || Tokyo, Japan || Decision (Unanimous)|| 3 || 3:00
|-  style="background:#cfc;"
| 2017-05-13|| Win ||align=left| Satomi Yuzuki || KHAOS 2 || Tokyo, Japan || Decision (Unanimous)|| 3 || 3:00
|-  style="background:#fbb;"
| 2017-02-18|| Loss ||align=left| Taio Asahisa || Krush.73 || Tokyo, Japan || Decision (Unanimous)|| 3 || 3:00
|-  style="background:#cfc;"
| 2016-10-15 || Win ||align=left| Yuki Matsuno || Krush.70 || Tokyo, Japan || Decision (Unanimous) || 3 || 3:00
|-  style="background:#fbb;"
| 2016-07-18 || Loss ||align=left| Shota Kanbe || Krush.67 || Tokyo, Japan || Decision (Unanimous) || 3 || 3:00
|-  style="background:#fbb;"
| 2016-03-20|| Loss ||align=left| Hirotaka Asahisa || Krush.64 || Tokyo, Japan || Decision (Unanimous) || 3 || 3:00
|-  style="background:#cfc;"
| 2016-01-07|| Win ||align=left|  Ryuma Tobe || Krush.62 || Tokyo, Japan || Decision (Unanimous) || 3 || 3:00
|-  style="background:#cfc;"
| 2015-11-14|| Win ||align=left|  Tomoya Aoki || Krush.60|| Tokyo, Japan || KO (Left Hook & Knee to the Body) || 2 || 2:48
|-  style="background:#cfc;"
| 2015-01-04|| Win ||align=left|  Yoshiki Takei || Krush.49|| Tokyo, Japan || Decision (Majority) || 3 || 3:00
|-  style="background:#cfc;"
| 2014-06-07|| Win ||align=left|  Keisuke Ishida || Krush-EX 2014 vol.4 || Tokyo, Japan || Decision (Majority) || 3 || 3:00
|-
! style=background:white colspan=9 |
|-  style="background:#cfc;"
| 2014-06-07|| Win ||align=left|  Shi-mo || Krush-EX 2014 vol.4 || Tokyo, Japan || Decision (Unanimous) || 3 || 3:00
|-  style="background:#cfc;"
| 2014-04-06|| Win ||align=left|  Satoru || Krush-EX 2014 vol.3 || Tokyo, Japan || Decision (Unanimous) || 3 || 3:00
|-  style="background:#cfc;"
| 2014-02-14|| Win ||align=left|  Ryota || Krush 38 || Tokyo, Japan || Decision (Unanimous) || 3 || 3:00
|-  style="background:#cfc;"
| 2013-12-14|| Win ||align=left|  Yu Thong A || Krush 35 || Tokyo, Japan || Decision (Unanimous) || 3 || 3:00
|-  style="background:#cfc;"
| 2013-10-13|| Win ||align=left|  Sho Ikeno || Krush-IGNITION 2013 vol.6 || Tokyo, Japan || Decision (Unanimous) || 3 || 3:00
|-  style="background:#cfc;"
| 2013-09-21|| Win ||align=left|  Shusei Hamada || Krush 33 || Tokyo, Japan || Decision (Unanimous) || 3 || 3:00
|-  style="background:#cfc;"
| 2013-07-013|| Win ||align=left|  Takayuki Minamino || Krush-IGNITION 2013 vol.5 || Japan || Decision (Majority) || 3 || 3:00
|-
| colspan=9 | Legend:    

|- 
|-  style="background:#fbb;"
| 2014-11-03|| Loss || align=left|  Ren Hiramoto || K-1 World GP 2014 -65kg Championship Tournament || Tokyo, Japan ||  Decision (Unanimous) || 3 || 3:00
|- 
! style=background:white colspan=9 |For the 2014 K-1 Koshien Title.
|-  style="background:#cfc;"
| 2014-07-21|| Win || align=left| Hirotaka Asahisa || K-1 Koshien 2014 Tournament, Semi Final || Tokyo, Japan || Decision (Unanimous) || 1 ||2:00
|-  style="background:#cfc;"
| 2014-07-21|| Win || align=left| Takayuki Minamino || K-1 Koshien 2014 Tournament, Quarter Final || Tokyo, Japan || Extra Round Decision (Split) || 2 ||2:00
|-  style="background:#cfc;"
| 2014-07-21|| Win || align=left| Yuta Kuwano || K-1 Koshien 2014 Tournament, Second Round || Tokyo, Japan || Decision || 1 ||2:00
|-  style="background:#cfc;"
| 2014-07-21|| Win || align=left| Yuya Saito || K-1 Koshien 2014 Tournament, First Round || Tokyo, Japan || Decision (Unanimous) || 1 ||2:00
|-
| colspan=9 | Legend:

External links
 Official K-1 profile

References

1997 births
Living people
Japanese male kickboxers